Amoli  may refer to:

People 
 Abul-Abbas Qassab Amoli (11th century), Sufi mystic
 Taleb Amoli (1586–1627), Iranian poet
 Muhammad Taqi Amoli (1887—1971), Iranian jurist and philosopher
 Mirza Hashem Amoli (1899–1993), Iranian Islamic scholar
 Hassan Hassanzadeh Amoli (1929–2021), Iranian theologian
 Abdollah Javadi-Amoli (born 1933), Iranian Islamic scholar and politician

Other uses 
 Amoli (film), a 2018 documentary
 Amoli, Almora, a village in India

See also 
 Al-Amuli (other persons with the name)